Carleton's Raid was a British raid led by Major Christopher Carleton in the American War of Independence. It was launched in the fall 1778 from the Province of Quebec against targets in upstate Province of New York.

Prelude
On October 24, 1778, with snow already on the ground but before Lake Champlain had frozen, a fleet of ships left Ile aux Noix for the southern part of Lake Champlain.

The ships were supported by two gunboats and many bateaux. The force comprised 454 men. The British Army forces were made up of regulars from the 29th, 31st, 53rd Regiments of Foot and the Royal Artillery supported by Loyalists from the King's Royal Regiment of New York, Hessian Jägers and about 100 Indian allies. The force was led by Major Christopher Carleton of the 29th Regiment of Foot.

Attacks
The fleet moved up the lake to about Crown Point on November 6, 1778, where parties of raiders were let off to attack Reymond's Mill on Beaver Creek, and Middlebury and New Haven on Otter Creek. The fleet then moved to Buttonmold Bay on November 7, where more raiding parties were sent to attack military supplies and Black powder, the town of Monkton, Vermont, and to Moore's Mill near Shoreham, Vermont, a meeting place for the Green Mountain Boys. At Moore's Mill the raiding party ran into a group of local militia, and there was a 20-minute skirmish before the local militia retired. One British soldier was wounded during this fight; American casualties are unknown.

When the force returned to Ile aux Noix on November 14, Major Carleton reported the raid had destroyed enough supplies for 12,000 men for a fou-month campaign. This included 1 saw mill, 1 grist mill, 47 houses, 48 barns, 28 stacks of wheat, and 75 stacks of hay. Over 80 head of cattle were captured and brought back to Quebec. Thirty-nine prisoners were taken to Saint-Jean-sur-Richelieu and forty to Quebec City over land through northern Vermont by Indians. The only Continental Army units in the area were Whitcomb's Rangers at Rutland, Vermont and Seth Warner's Green Mountain Boys at Fort Edward. The raid had been expected by the American forces but the raid was so late in the year that almost all the forces had gone into winter quarters and were not in a position to stop the raid.

The British losses during the raid were 1 man killed by a falling tree, 1 bateau lost with 17 men on the lake on the return voyage to Ile aux Noix, and 1 wounded at the fight at Moore's Mill. The raid was followed up in 1780 by multiple raids called the Burning of the Valleys, with Major Carleton leading a force down Lake Champlain again while Sir John Johnson lead a force in the Mohawk and Schoharie Valley, and Lieutenant Houghton leading a raid towards the Connecticut River in the Royalton Raid.

Notes

References
The American Journals of Lt. John Enys, John Enys and Elizabeth Cometti (editor), Syracuse University Press 1976
The Burning of the Valleys, Gavin K. Watt, Dundurn Press 1997
Carleton's Raid, Ida H. Washington and Paul A. Washington, Cherry Tree Books 1977

1778 in the United States
Addison County, Vermont
Conflicts in 1778
Battles of the American Revolutionary War in Vermont
Battles of the American Revolutionary War in New York (state)
1778 in New York (state)
Military raids
1778 in Vermont
Battles in the Northern theater of the American Revolutionary War after Saratoga